Belleview is a city in Marion County, Florida, United States. The population was 5,413 at the 2020 census, up from 4,492 in 2010. It is part of the Ocala Metropolitan Statistical Area. The city's name comes from the French words belle and vue, meaning "beautiful view". "The City with Small Town Charm" is the city's motto.

History
A post office has been in operation at Belleview since 1883.

Geography
U.S. Routes 27, 441, and 301 pass through the center of town. All three lead northwest  to Ocala, the county seat. Routes 27 and 441 lead southeast  to Leesburg, while Route 301 leads south  to Wildwood.

Demographics

As of the census of 2000, there were 3,478 people, 1,600 households, and 956 families residing in the city. The population density was 1,905.5 inhabitants per square mile (733.8/km2). The racial makeup of the city was 91.14% White, 4.23% African American, 0.46% Native American, 0.58% Asian, 2.10% from other races, and 1.50% from two or more races. Hispanic or Latino of any race were 7.68% of the population.

There were 1,600 households, out of which 22.5% had children under the age of 18 living with them, 41.8% were married couples living together, 14.4% had a female householder with no husband present, and 40.2% were non-families. 34.6% of all households were made up of individuals, and 19.7% had someone living alone who was 65 years of age or older. The average household size was 2.14 and the average family size was 2.72.

In the city, the population was spread out, with 20.2% under the age of 18, 8.3% from 18 to 24, 23.5% from 25 to 44, 20.4% from 45 to 64, and 27.5% who were 65 years of age or older. The median age was 43 years. For every 100 females, there were 87.7 males. For every 100 females age 18 and over, there were 82.3 males.

The median income for a household in the city was $26,250, and the median income for a family was $33,701. Males had a median income of $27,500 versus $18,250 for females. The per capita income for the city was $18,241. About 8.8% of families and 12.3% of the population were below the poverty line, including 12.8% of those under age 18 and 7.4% of those age 65 or over.

Educational facilities
The town's school district is Marion County Public Schools. The schools in Belleview are:

 Belleview High School
 Belleview Middle School
 Belleview Elementary School
 Belleview-Santos Elementary School

References

External links
 

Cities in Marion County, Florida
Populated places established in 1854
Cities in Florida
1854 establishments in Florida